David Keith Bernard Basham (born June 1968) is an Australian politician. He has been a Liberal member of the South Australian House of Assembly since the 2018 state election, representing Finniss. Basham served as the Minister for Primary Industries and Regional Development in the Marshall Ministry between 2020 and 2022.

Basham was the president of Australian Dairy Farmers before his preselection to run for Finniss.

References

 

Members of the South Australian House of Assembly
1968 births
Living people
Liberal Party of Australia members of the Parliament of South Australia
21st-century Australian politicians